Patinoa is a genus of trees in the family Malvaceae, native to Panama and South America.

Species
Currently recognized species in Patinoa are:
Patinoa almirajo Cuatrec.
Patinoa ichthyotoxica R.E. Schult. & Cuatrec.
Patinoa paraensis (Huber) Cuatrec.
Patinoa sphaerocarpa Cuatrec.

References

Malvaceae genera
Bombacoideae